Brahim Boulami (born April 20, 1972 in Safi) is a Moroccan athlete who set two world records in the 3,000 meter steeplechase, 7:55.28 and 7:53.17. The latter was overturned because he tested positive for the banned performance-enhancing drug EPO. Boulami was banned for two years in 2002 after the positive test. His time of 7:55.28 in the 3000 meter steeplechase from the  year before the positive test is currently the fourth fastest ever run.

His older brother Khalid Boulami is an Olympic bronze medalist.

See also 
List of sportspeople sanctioned for doping offences

References

External links 

Living people
1972 births
Moroccan male steeplechase runners
Athletes (track and field) at the 1996 Summer Olympics
Athletes (track and field) at the 2000 Summer Olympics
Olympic athletes of Morocco
Doping cases in athletics
Moroccan sportspeople in doping cases
People from Safi, Morocco
Mediterranean Games gold medalists for Morocco
Athletes (track and field) at the 1997 Mediterranean Games
Athletes (track and field) at the 2005 Mediterranean Games
Universiade medalists in athletics (track and field)
Goodwill Games medalists in athletics
Mediterranean Games medalists in athletics
Universiade silver medalists for Morocco
Universiade bronze medalists for Morocco
Medalists at the 1995 Summer Universiade
Competitors at the 1998 Goodwill Games
Competitors at the 2001 Goodwill Games
Goodwill Games gold medalists in athletics